Hugh Auld Morton (25 November 1902 – 23 August 1980) was a Scottish footballer who played for Kilmarnock and Scotland, mainly at right half. He took part in the 1929 Scottish Cup Final in which Killie claimed the trophy by beating Rangers, and in the 1932 final, a defeat to the same opposition after a replay. He then fell out of favour and spent most of the 1932–33 season at Morton, but was then re-signed by Kilmarnock and finished his career there.

Two other players named Hugh Morton, both also from the Newmilns / Darvel area, featured for Kilmarnock in the 1900s but neither was a close relative, nor was teammate John Morton (a goalkeeper).

References

Sources

External links

1902 births
1980 deaths
Scottish footballers
Footballers from East Ayrshire
Association football wing halves
Scotland international footballers
Kilmarnock F.C. players
Darvel F.C. players
Scottish Junior Football Association players
Greenock Morton F.C. players
Scottish Football League players
Scottish Football League representative players